Can't Make Up My Mind may refer to:

 "Can't Make Up My Mind" (Sonique song)
 "Can't Make Up My Mind", a song by The Seekers
 "Can't Make Up My Mind", a song by John Gorka from Between Five and Seven